Gunma At-large district was a constituency of the House of Representatives in the Diet of Japan (national legislature) in the election of 1946. It consisted of the entire prefecture of Gunma and elected ten Representatives by limited voting with two votes.

Election Result

References 

Districts of the House of Representatives (Japan)
Gunma Prefecture